The men's decathlon competition of the athletics events at the 2015 Pan American Games took place between the 22 and 23 of July at the CIBC Pan Am and Parapan Am Athletics Stadium. The defending Pan American Games champion at the time was Leonel Suárez from Cuba.

Records
Prior to this competition, the existing world and Pan American Games records were as follows:

Qualification

Each National Olympic Committee (NOC) was able to enter up to two entrants providing they had met the minimum standard (7063) in the qualifying period (January 1, 2014 to June 28, 2015).

Schedule

Results
All times shown are in seconds.

100 m
Wind: +1.4 (both races)

Long jump

Shot put

High jump

400 metres

110 metres hurdles

Discus throw

Pole vault

Javelin throw

1500 metres

Final standings

References

Athletics at the 2015 Pan American Games
2015